Subterraneans are an art-rock band from London, England. Fronted by former Angelhead vocalist and songwriter Jude Rawlins, they also feature former Wave guitarist Carl Homer, former Solstice bass player Robin Phillips, and Van der Graaf Generator drummer Guy Evans.

Film, theatre and television

Subterraneans have recorded soundtracks for several films, including the official 70th anniversary soundtrack to G.W. Pabst's celebrated movie Pandora's Box, starring Louise Brooks, and Maya Deren's At Land.

Their music has also featured in shows by performance artist Judy Neville (whose voice can also be heard on Subterraneans' track "Fall Out"), and poet Suzanne Andrade, whose 2006 Edinburgh Festival show Invisible Ink included excerpts from the band's Pandora's Box soundtrack.

The band is named after the closing track on David Bowie's Low album and were given their name by Billy Mackenzie.

Discography

Studio albums
April May June (1993)
Mona Lisa (1998)
Soul Mass Transit (2006)
Eights and Rhymes (2008)
This Too Shall Pass (2011)
Goodbye Voyager (2017)

Extended plays
Slide EP (1995)

Soundtrack albums
Pandora's Box (2001)
Themes for Maya Deren (2004)

Live albums
Live in Berlin (2008)

Compilation albums
Orly Flight (2003)
Underground: The Singles 1992-2011 (2012)

Singles
"Dream Fades Into Dark" (1992)
"No" featuring Billy Mackenzie (1996)
"She Walks on Water" (1997)
"Hazel Eyes" (1998)
"The Last Time" featuring Angie Bowie (2002)
"Canticle in D" (2006)
"Love X Plus Y" (2006)
"I'm for You" (2010)
"A Lot Like Love" (2011)

Sources

 Rawlins, Jude (2004). Cul, de Sac: Lyrics, Prose and Poems 1987-2004 (3rd ed.). Hampstead House Press. .
 Clark, Lisa (11 February 2005). The Lives of Jude Rawlins. Artsweek.

External links 
 Official website
 Subterraneans on MySpace.Com
 Jude Rawlins website
 Carl Homer website
 The Electric Label, Subterraneans' London-based record label

Musical groups from London
English rock music groups